Raffles is a British radio programme including eighteen episodes that first aired on BBC Radio 4 from 1985 to 1992, and an additional radio play that aired in 1993 on the BBC World Service.  The series was directed by Gordon House and was based on the A. J. Raffles stories (first published 1898–1909) by author E. W. Hornung.

The series starred Jeremy Clyde as fictional gentleman thief A. J. Raffles, and Michael Cochrane as Raffles's companion Bunny Manders.

Raffles is occasionally rebroadcast on radio by the BBC and has been released on home audio.

Background and production

The series was a BBC Radio 4 and BBC World Service co-production. The first two series were adapted from E. W. Hornung's stories by David Buck, and the last series was adapted by Olwen Wymark. The director was Gordon House, and the signature tune was composed by Jim Parker. Jeremy Clyde played A. J. Raffles, and Michael Cochrane played Bunny Manders. Henry Stamper played a major recurring character, police detective Inspector Mackenzie.

Jeremy Clyde and Michael Cochrane had previously portrayed Raffles and Bunny respectively in the first episode of the 1978 BBC One television series Crime Writers, a documentary series about the history of crime fiction. In the same episode, Clyde and Cochrane also portrayed characters that inspired the creation of Raffles and Bunny, Sherlock Holmes and Dr. Watson, as well as the fictional detective C. Auguste Dupin and Dupin's unnamed companion.

After playing Raffles and Bunny in eighteen episodes on BBC Radio 4 between 1985 and 1992, all adapted from Hornung's stories, Clyde and Cochrane reprised their roles for the radio dramatisation of Graham Greene's play The Return of A. J. Raffles, which aired on the BBC World Service on 17 January 1993. The third series of Raffles had also been broadcast on the BBC World Service from 10 December 1992 though 14 January 1993. Henry Stamper reprised his role as Inspector Mackenzie for the 1993 radio play. Gordon House, who directed the Raffles series, also adapted and directed the production, and it used the Raffles series theme music composed by Jim Parker.

Cast

Main
 Jeremy Clyde as A. J. Raffles, a gentleman thief and cricketer
 Michael Cochrane as Bunny Manders, Raffles's companion

Recurring
 Henry Stamper as Inspector Mackenzie, a detective from Scotland Yard
 Ron Pember as Crawshay, a rival working-class thief (Series 1)
 Gordon Reid as Dr Theobald, a physician in Earl's Court, London (Series 3)
 John Hartley as Mr Maturin, an alter ego of Raffles (Series 3)
 Gudrun Ure as Mrs Fisher, a landlady in Ham Common (Series 3)

Episodes

Three series were aired with six 30-minute episodes each. An additional 60-minute radio play was broadcast in 1993, and was included in the BBC's home audio release of the third series.

Series 1

Series 2

Series 3

Release

The series has been rebroadcast occasionally on BBC Radio 4 Extra since its original release.

The first two series of Raffles were released together digitally by BBC Worldwide and on CD by BBC Books in 2015. The third series was released in 2017. The release of the third series includes "The Return of A. J. Raffles" by Graham Greene.

References

British radio dramas
BBC Radio 4 programmes
BBC Radio dramas
1985 radio programme debuts
Works based on A. J. Raffles